Walter Raymond was a novelist.

Walter Raymond may also refer to:

Walter John Raymond, academic
Walter Raymond, namesake of Raymond, California

See also